Lagina or Laginia (Λαγινία) was a town in the territory of Stratonicea, in ancient Caria. It contained an important temple of Hecate, at which every year great festivals were celebrated. Tacitus, when speaking of the worship of Trivia among the Stratoniceans, evidently means Hecate. Its site is located near Turgut, Asiatic Turkey. 

Recent studies have shown that the site had been inhabited and/or employed in an uninterrupted manner during a time span stretching back to the Bronze Age. Seleucid kings conducted a considerable reconstruction effort in the sacred ground of Lagina and transformed it into a foremost religious center of its time, with the nearby (at a distance of 11 kilometers) site of Stratonicea becoming the administrative center. The two sites (Lagina and Stratonikeia) were connected to each other in antiquity by a 'sacred path' which began at the north gate of the town. Before the foundation of Stratonicea in the mid-3rd century BCE, the sanctuary of Lagina was governed by the town of Koranza nearby.

Lagina was the only site of a monumental temple to Hecate, and therefore the rituals carried out were unique. Part of these rituals included a "Key-Carrying" ceremony in which a choir of young girls would walk from Lagina to Stratonicea to declare their devotion to the city. On their return, the gates would be opened by the girl carrying the key, and the religious festivities would begin. The goddess Hecate was so important to the area around Stratonicea that coins were made showing her likeness.

The archaeological research conducted in Lagina is historically significant in that it was the first to have been done by a Turkish scientific team, under the direction of Osman Hamdi Bey and Halit Ethem Bey. In 1993, excavation and restoration work was resumed under the guidance of Muğla Museum, by an international team advised by Professor Ahmet Tırpan.

In 2020, the ancient columns of the Hecate temple were re-erected following extensive restoration and excavation at the site. The head of excavation at the temple, Professor Bilal Sögüt noted that visitors could now see where the columns would have stood 2050 years ago when the temple was a place of worship to the goddess Hecate. The columns were built in the Corinthian order, with 8 columns on the shorter sides of the temple, and 11 on the longer sides. An inscription on the entrance gate indicate that Emperor Augustus financially supported the Sanctuary of Hecate.

The friezes of the Hecate sanctuary are displayed in the Istanbul Archaeology Museums. Four different themes are depicted in these friezes. These are, on the eastern frieze, scenes from the life of Zeus; on the western frieze, a battle between gods and giants; on the southern frieze, a gathering of Carian gods; and on the northern frieze, a battle of Amazons.

Lagina was Christianised at an early date and was the seat of a bishop; no longer a residential see, it remains a titular see of the Roman Catholic Church.

References

Ancient Greek archaeological sites in Turkey
Populated places in ancient Caria
Seleucid colonies in Anatolia
Catholic titular sees in Asia
Archaeological sites in the Aegean Region
Holy cities
Yatağan District
History of Muğla Province
Hecate